Sohrab is a Pakistani bicycle company manufacturing both bicycles and its parts. The company is based in Lahore, Pakistan.

History
The company began in 1952 with a core of traders in Lahore, following a foreign exchange crisis which severely restricted imports in Pakistan. The traders saw an opportunity to domestically produce and sell bicycles, and consequently founded Sohrab on 8 September 1953 under Section 9 of the Co-operative Societies Act II of 1912. It initially had 22 members and produced 5 bicycles a day. It now has 228 members and produces approximately 2000 bicycles a day.

Structure
Sohrab was setup keeping its workers in mind. All controlling powers of the company lay with the general body, who are elected into power every 3 years. Since its inception, elections have been held on a regular basis. Sohrab continues to maintain its social principles with a subsidized workers canteen and company hospital. It also pays for five of its workers to attend the Hajj pilgrimage in Mecca each year.

Products
Sohrab initially manufactured a single-speed roadster bicycle.  This had a lugged steel frame and rod-brakes.  This bicycle is still in production more than 50 years later.  More modern MTB and BMX style bicycles were added to the range in the 1990s. Sohrab have also diversified into producing cargo-tricycles, gymnasium equipment, push-chairs and wheelchairs.  The latter are sold at cost price. In 1994, Sohrab entered the motorcycle market with the JS70. A larger version of this was later used as the basis for an auto-rickshaw.

Markets
Sohrab’s primary market is in mainly remote and rural population areas of Pakistan where the motorbikes and cars are still not affordable to some people. A few big city people ride the bicycles on the city streets for exercise and have formed bicycling clubs for themselves.

Major export markets have also been established in Afghanistan and Bangladesh. Sohrab wheelchairs are also distributed in Madagascar through a French rotary club.

References

External links
 Official Sohrab Cycles website

Cycle manufacturers of Pakistan
Motorcycle manufacturers of Pakistan
Manufacturing companies based in Lahore
Cooperatives in Pakistan
Vehicle manufacturing companies established in 1952
Pakistani brands
Pakistani companies established in 1952